Tapirapé (also known as Apyãwa) is a Tupí-Guaraní language of Brazil.

Language contact
Ribeiro (2012) finds a number of Apyãwa loanwords in Karajá (such as bèhyra ‘carrying basket’, kòmỹdawyra ‘andu beans’, hãrara ‘macaw (sp.)’, tarawè ‘parakeet (sp.)’, txakohi ‘Txakohi ceremonial mask’, hyty ‘garbage (Javaé dialect)’) as well as several Karajá loans in Apyãwa (tãtã ‘banana’, tori ‘White man’, marara ‘turtle stew’, irãwore ‘Irabure ceremonial mask’). Some of the latter loans are also found in other Tupí-Guaraní languages closely related to Apyãwa, such as Parakanã and Asuriní of Trocará (sata ‘banana’, toria ‘White man’).

References

Tupi–Guarani languages
Languages of Brazil